Hazara or Hazaragi clothing has an important and special role in supporting the traditional cultural and social identity of the Hazaras. Hazara clothes are produced manually and by machine; in Afghanistan Hazara clothing is sewn in most parts of the country, especially in the central provinces of the country.

Male clothing 
Hazara men traditionally wear clothes and hats made from a manufactured fabric called barak or burruk. Barak is a kind of soft, durable and thick fabric made from the first wool of lambs of special sheep that are raised in Hazaristan (Hazarajat). Barak can be used to make moisture-resistant winter clothes and is regarded as stylish and regal cloth by the Hazaras. Barak is said to have a special softness and to reduces muscle and joint pains. Nowadays, the most common clothing item among Hazara men is the perahan o tunban.

Female clothing 
The traditional clothing of Hazara women includes a pleated skirt with a tunban or undergarment. Cheaper fabrics are used for the lower skirts, while the upper are often made of better matierals, such as velvet or zari, with decorative nets or borders at the bottom. The women's shirt is calf-length, close-collared, and long-sleeved, and has slits on both sides that are placed on the skirts, which are admired for their completeness in the Islamic set. Hazara women's clothing has certain characteristics according to their social, economic, and age conditions. The clothes of young Hazara women are made of different fabrics in different colours and designs with colourful chador, but older women tend towards darker-coloured fabrics and patterns. Hazara women's chador is often decorated with ornaments that are often silver or gold, and sometimes with a hat. Other ornaments include silver or gold necklaces with colourful beads, buttons, bangles, and silver or gold bracelets.

Headgear 
Hazaras traditionally wear headgear or hats, which are of different types for men and women. There are different types of Hazara hats and caps, some of which are made from animal skin and some from barak. Some Hazara men also wear the turban of Khorasan.

See also 
 Clothing in Afghanistan
 Central Asian clothing
 Islamic clothing
 Hazara culture

Gallery

References 

Hazaragi culture
Afghan clothing